Me and the Mafia is a 1973 Danish comedy film directed by Henning Ørnbak and starring Dirch Passer.

Plot
The film follows the con man Victor Hansen, who has made a fortune together with his partner Rikard. Rikard has deposited the money in a Swiss bank account, and has had the account number tattooed on the buttocks of four young women; he is then killed by a mafia gang. Victor tries to find the girls to get access to the account and the money, but is thwarted by the mafia. In the end he is allowed to keep his life, but has to sell pieces of Venice to rich tourists on the mafia's behalf.

Cast

 Dirch Passer - Victor 'Viffer' Hansen
 Klaus Pagh - Rikard Abelsteen
 Tove Maës - Lily
 Poul Bundgaard - Vittorio Ferucci
 Susanne Heinrich - Marcellina
 Jørgen Kiil - Arnold von Cleef
 Vera Gebuhr - Krøll Knudsen
 Anette Karlsen - Merete
 Lisbet Lundquist - Majbritt
 Jane Thomsen - Janne Petersen
 Ove Verner Hansen - Klumpen / Møller
 Edward Fleming - Arthur
 Ole Ishøy - Klumpen's assistant
 Freddy Albeck - Don Luigi
 Otto Brandenburg - Dino
 Per Goldschmidt - Carlo
 Poul Glargaard - Capo
 Karl Stegger - Andersen, prison guard
 Ole Monty - Undertaker
 Gotha Andersen - Milkman
 Lulu Ziegler - A Danish-American woman
 Harald Jørgensen - Her husband
 Hannah Bjarnhof - Sergent Bentsen
 Preben Ravn - Busse
 Marianne Wesén - Mother of a child being baptised
 Carl-Hugo Calander - Museum inspector Söderstrand
 Ellen Margrethe Stein - Dog-loving judge
 Elisabeth Nørager - Soldier Frederiksen
 Simon Rosenbaum - Tinsmith
 Ebba Amfeldt - Cleaning lady at a Swedish museum
 Hardy Rafn - Man by photo booth
 Henning Ørnbak - Swiss banker

References

External links

1973 films
1973 comedy films
Danish comedy films
1970s Danish-language films
Films directed by Henning Ørnbak